Huerteales is the botanical name for an order of flowering plants. It is one of the 17 orders that make up the large eudicot group known as the rosids in the APG III system of plant classification. Within the rosids, it is one of the orders in Malvidae, a group formerly known as eurosids II and now known informally as the malvids. This is true whether Malvidae is circumscribed broadly to include eight orders as in APG III, or more narrowly to include only four orders. Huerteales consists of four small families, Petenaeaceae, Gerrardinaceae, Tapisciaceae, and Dipentodontaceae.<ref name="worberg2009">Andreas Worberg, Mac H. Alford, Dietmar Quandt, and Thomas Borsch. 2009. "Huerteales sister to Brassicales plus Malvales, and newly circumscribed to include Dipentodon, Gerrardina, Huertea, Perrottetia, and Tapiscia. Taxon 58(2):468-478.</ref>

Petenaeaceae consists of a single genus and species Petenaea cordata from Southern Mexico, Guatemala and Belize.

Gerrardinaceae consists of a single genus, Gerrardina. Tapisciaceae has two genera, Tapiscia and Huertea.Dezhu Li, Jie Cai, and Wen Jun. 2008. "Tapisciaceae" page 496. In: Zhengyi Wu, Peter H. Raven, and Deyuan Hong (editors). Flora of China volume 11. Science Press: Beijing, China; Missouri Botanical Garden Press: St. Louis, Missouri, USA. 

Until 2006, Dipentodontaceae was treated as consisting of a single genus, Dipentodon. Since that time, some authors have included Perrottetia in Dipentodontaceae, even though no formal revision of the family has been published as of 2008. Thus the order Huerteales consists of six genera. The largest genus, Perrottetia, contains about 15 of the approximate total of 25 species in the order.

The Huerteales are shrubs or small trees found in most tropical or warm temperate regions. The flowers of Perrottetia have been studied in detail, but otherwise, all five of the genera are poorly known. The order is based on molecular phylogenetic analysis of DNA sequences.

Description
All of the Huerteales are woody plants. The leaves are alternate with toothed margins. The inflorescence is cymose, but sometimes nearly racemose or umbelliform. The bases of the calyx, corolla and stamens are fused to form a hypanthium which is in some cases very short. The ovary is unilocular, at least at the top, with one or two ovules per carpel. The number of carpels is variable.

Other characters are generally found in Huerteales, but with the exceptions noted below. Gerrardina differs from the rest of Huerteales in that the stamens are opposite the petals, instead of being opposite the sepals. Dipentodon and Perrottetia are distinctive in that the calyx and corolla are not well differentiated, but resemble each other. Tapiscia and Huertea have a calyx tube and compound, rather than simple leaves. Tapiscia has a uniloculate ovary with a single ovule. Huertea has one locule containing two ovules, or two locules, each containing one ovule. Gerrardina, Dipentodon, and Perrottetia have two ovules in each locule. Tapiscia lacks the nectary disk that is characteristic of the order. Huertea lacks stipules.

History
Until the first decade of the twenty-first century, the five genera of Huerteales had usually been placed into three unrelated families. Tapiscia and Huertea had long been known to be related. Most authors had placed them in Staphyleaceae and had placed that family in the order Sapindales. Armen Takhtajan established the family Tapisciaceae in 1987 and placed it in Sapindales, but this treatment was not followed by many others and it did not stand up to phylogenetic analysis. Since that time, Staphyleaceae has been recircumscribed. It no longer includes Tapiscia and Huertea  and it is in the order Crossosomatales.

For most of the twentieth century, Gerrardina and Dipentodon had usually been placed in Flacourtiaceae, a family that is now recognized by only a few taxonomists, and then only as a segregate of Salicaceae.Sue Zmarzty et alii. (in press). "Salicaceae" In: The Families and Genera of Vascular Plants. Springer-Verlag: Berlin;Heidelberg, Germany. Perrottetia, meanwhile, had usually been placed, with considerable doubt, in Celastraceae.

Ever since Dipentodon was named in 1911, there had been occasional suggestions that it might be related to Tapiscia and Huertea. In 2001, Alexander Doweld established the order Huerteales, defining it to consist of Tapiscia, Huertea, and Dipentodon. This grouping was later supported by molecular phylogenetic studies. In 2006, a study of DNA sequences showed that Perrottetia was misplaced in Celastrales and that it is sister to Dipentodon in Huerteales. Also in 2006, it was found that Gerrardina'' is a malvid, but its placement within this group remained uncertain.

In 2009, Andreas Worberg and co-authors produced the first phylogenetic study that included all of the genera of Huerteales. From one of their data matrices, they derived a well supported phylogeny for the order, as well as strongly supported relationships among the four orders of malvids.

Phylogeny
The phylogeny shown below is the one found by Worberg and co-authors. Monospecific genera are represented by species names.

References

External links
 Huerteales At: Angiosperm Phylogeny Website At: Missouri Botanical Garden Website
 Family and Suprafamilial Names At: James L. Reveal

 
Angiosperm orders